The Lander–Stewart Mansion and Stites Building are two historic houses in Phillipsburg, Warren County, New Jersey. The Lander–Stewart Mansion, built , is at 102 South Main Street and the adjoining Stites-Lander Townhouse, built , is at 104 South Main Street. They were added to the National Register of Historic Places on June 25, 2008.

Gallery

References

Phillipsburg, New Jersey	
National Register of Historic Places in Warren County, New Jersey
New Jersey Register of Historic Places
Italianate architecture in New Jersey
Buildings and structures in Warren County, New Jersey
Houses completed in 1835
Houses completed in 1880